Dahaneh-e Zurak (also Romanized as Dahaneh-e Zūrak; also known as Eslāmābād) is a village in Dalfard Rural District, Sarduiyeh District, Jiroft County, Kerman Province, Iran. At the 2006 census, its population was 605, in 101 families.

References 

Populated places in Jiroft County